Moldova participated in the Eurovision Song Contest 2007 with the song "Fight" written by Alexandru Braşoveanu and Elena Buga. The song was performed by Natalia Barbu. The Moldovan broadcaster TeleRadio-Moldova (TRM) internally selected the Moldovan entry for the 2007 contest in Helsinki, Finland. 34 entries competed to represent Moldova in Helsinki though a process entitled Pentru Eurovision 2007, with three being shortlisted to participate in a live audition on 14 December 2006 where "Fight" performed by Natalia Barbu was selected by an expert jury.

Moldova competed in the semi-final of the Eurovision Song Contest which took place on 10 May 2007. Performing during the show in position 9, "Fight" was announced among the top 10 entries of the semi-final and therefore qualified to compete in the final on 12 May. It was later revealed that Moldova placed tenth out of the 28 participating countries in the semi-final with 91 points. In the final, Moldova was the closing performance of the show in position 24, placing tenth out of the 24 participating countries with 109 points.

Background 

Prior to the 2007 Contest, Moldova had participated in the Eurovision Song Contest two times since its first entry in 2005. The nation's best placing in the contest was sixth, which it achieved in 2005 with the song "Boonika bate doba" performed by Zdob și Zdub. In the 2006 contest, Moldova was represented with the song "Loca" performed by Arsenium featuring Natalia Gordienko and Connect-R which placed twentieth in the final.

The Moldovan national broadcaster, TeleRadio-Moldova (TRM), broadcast the event within Moldova and organised the selection process for the nation's entry. TRM confirmed their intentions to participate at the 2007 Eurovision Song Contest on 15 November 2006 despite having considered to withdraw due to lack of funds for participation. The broadcaster opted to select their entry in 2007 via an internal selection, marking the first time that a Moldovan entry was internally selected; Moldova has selected their entry via a national selection show in 2005 and 2006.

Before Eurovision

Pentru Eurovision 2007 
Artists and composers had the opportunity to submit their entries between 26 November 2006 and 10 December 2006. Both artists and songwriters were required to be of Moldovan nationality and could each submit more than one song. Artists were also required to fund their own potential participation at the Eurovision Song Contest with TRM only covering the expense of the entrance fee, but in the event of a top ten placing at the final of the contest all expenses would be covered by TRM instead. At the conclusion of the submission deadline, 34 valid entries out of 35 were received by the broadcaster; "Can You" performed by 3 BUCKS was disqualified. Among the artists that submitted a song was 2005 Moldovan Eurovision entrant Zdob și Zdub.

The selection of the Moldovan entry for the Eurovision Song Contest 2007, entitled Pentru Eurovision 2007, took place over two rounds. The first round occurred on 13 December 2006 where a jury consisting of Valentin Dânga (composer), Ghenadie Ciobanu (composer), Oleg Baraliuc (composer), Inesa Stratulat (singer), Vlad Costandoi (producer), Natalia Brasnuev (President of OGAE Moldova), Rodica Ciorănică (journalist and editor at VIP Magazine) and Diana Stratulat (general producer of NIT TV) was to select seven to ten entries out of the 34 received to proceed to the second round. However, only three were ultimately shortlisted due to the large margin of votes received between the entries ranked third and fourth. The second round was a live audition of the three entries in front of the jury panel that took place on 14 December 2006, where "Fight" performed by Natalia Barbu was selected to represent Moldova.

Promotion 
Natalia Barbu specifically promoted "Fight" as the Moldovan Eurovision entry on 6 March by performing the song as a guest during the sixth show of the Spanish Eurovision national final.

At Eurovision

According to Eurovision rules, all nations with the exceptions of the host country, the "Big Four" (France, Germany, Spain and the United Kingdom) and the ten highest placed finishers in the 2006 contest are required to qualify from the semi-final on 10 May 2007 in order to compete for the final on 12 May 2007; the top ten countries from the semi-final progress to the final. On 12 March 2007, a special allocation draw was held which determined the running order for the semi-final and Moldova was set to perform in position 9, following the entry from Switzerland and before the entry from the Netherlands.

The two shows were televised in Moldova on Moldova 1 and broadcast via radio on Radio Moldova. All broadcasts featured commentary by Vitalie Rotaru. The Moldovan spokesperson, who announced the Moldovan votes during the final, was Andrei Porubin.

Semi-final 
Natalia Barbu took part in technical rehearsals on 3 and 5 May, followed by dress rehearsals on 9 and 10 May. The Moldovan performance featured Natalia Barbu dressed in a leather top with leather trousers and performing on stage with three dancers and two backing vocalists. The performance began with Barbu appearing silhouetted against the stage, and a violin solo was later performed by the singer with the dancers performing a routine that included flying red scarves as well as raising and twirling a large silver silken banner. The stage featured LED screen projections that transition from neon lines to burning sparks and streams of metal. The backing vocalists that joined Natalia Barbu on stage are Liusia Znamensky and Rodica Aculova.

At the end of the show, Moldova was announced as having finished in the top ten and subsequently qualifying for the grand final. It was later revealed that Moldova placed tenth in the semi-final, receiving a total of 91 points.

Final 
The draw for the running order for the final was done by the presenters during the announcement of the ten qualifying countries during the semi-final and Moldova was drawn to perform last in position 24, following the entry from Armenia. Natalia Barbu once again took part in dress rehearsals on 11 and 12 May before the final and performed a repeat of her semi-final performance during the final on 12 May. Moldova placed tenth in the final, scoring 109 points.

Voting 
Below is a breakdown of points awarded to Moldova and awarded by Moldova in the semi-final and grand final of the contest. The nation awarded its 12 points to Belarus in the semi-final and to Romania in the final of the contest.

Points awarded to Moldova

Points awarded by Moldova

References

2007
Countries in the Eurovision Song Contest 2007
Eurovision